Nikolay Aleksandrovich Sidorov (born 23 November 1956) is a former Soviet track and field athlete where he won the Soviet 100 metre championships  on two occasions, he was then the  winner of the gold medal in the 4 × 100 m relay at the 1980 Summer Olympics.

At the Moscow Olympics, Sidorov was eliminated in the semifinal of the 200 m and ran the second leg in the gold medal-winning Soviet 4 × 100 m relay team. At the 1982 European Championships, Sidorov was fifth in the 100 m and won the gold medal as a member of the Soviet 4 × 100 m relay team. He also participated in the first World Championships, where he was eliminated in the heats of the 100 m and won the bronze medal as a member of the Soviet 4 × 100 m relay team.

Achievements

External links 

1956 births
Living people
Russian male sprinters
Soviet male sprinters
Olympic athletes of the Soviet Union
Athletes (track and field) at the 1980 Summer Olympics
Olympic gold medalists for the Soviet Union
World Athletics Championships athletes for the Soviet Union
World Athletics Championships medalists
European Athletics Championships medalists
Athletes from Moscow
Olympic gold medalists in athletics (track and field)
Universiade medalists in athletics (track and field)
Universiade silver medalists for the Soviet Union
Medalists at the 1980 Summer Olympics
Medalists at the 1981 Summer Universiade
Medalists at the 1983 Summer Universiade
Friendship Games medalists in athletics